Paolo Grassi (30 October 1919 – 14 March 1981) was an Italian theatrical impresario.

Grassi was born in Milan, Italy. As a young man, he worked in magazines and discovered a passion for the theater. It led him in 1937 to create a Bertoldissimo (musical work), which he oversaw and directed. He organized the theater company Ninchi-Dori-Tumiati and founded the avant-garde group Palcoscenico (Stage). Grassi was a Socialist. During the Second World War, he was conscripted into the army but went over to the Italian resistance movement, including working with the socialist newspaper Avanti!. In 1947, with Giorgio Strehler, friend and associate, Grassi founded the Piccolo Teatro di Milano, the first Italian civic theater. It was later renamed, in his honor, the Teatro Paolo Grassi.

In 1964, he purchased the Teatro San Ferdinando with Strehler, renaming it Teatrale Napoletana. From 1972 to 1977 he was superintendent of the La Scala theatre, while from 1977 to 1980 held the post of president of Italy's state broadcaster RAI. He later became director of the Electa publishing house.

Grassi died in London in 1981 following heart surgery and is buried at the Monumental Cemetery of Milan. The Scuola d'arte drammatica Paolo Grassi ("School of Dramatic Arts Paolo Grassi") in Milan is named in his honour.

References

Bibliography
Paolo Grassi. Lettere 1942-1980, a cura di Guido Vergani, Skira, Milano (2004)
Quarant’anni di palcoscenico, a cura di Emilio Pozzi, Mursia, Milano 1977

1919 births
1981 deaths
Impresarios
Rai (broadcaster) people
Businesspeople from Milan
Italian theatre directors
Burials at the Cimitero Monumentale di Milano
Theatre people from Milan